Lepetodrilus pustulosus  is a species of small, deep-sea sea snail, a hydrothermal vent limpet, a marine gastropod mollusk in the family Lepetodrilidae.

Description
The size of the shell reaches 6 mm.

Distribution
This species occurs in hydrothermal vents and seeps off the East Pacific Rise and the Galapagos Rift

References

  A. & Bouchet, P. (2001) Gastropoda and Monoplacophora from hydrothermal vents and seeps; new taxa and records. The Veliger, 44, 116–231.

External links
 

Lepetodrilidae
Gastropods described in 1988